Ernst Willy Larsen (18 July 1926 – 2 December 2015) was a Norwegian athlete, who competed mainly in the 3000 metre steeplechase. He represented Ranheim IL.

Larsen won the bronze medal in this event at the 1956 Summer Olympics held in Melbourne, Australia as well as the 1954 European Championships in Athletics.

His personal best time was 8:42.4 minutes, achieved in Trondheim on 5 September 1956. This gives him a 23rd place on the Norwegian all-time performers list.

References

1926 births
2015 deaths
Norwegian male long-distance runners
Olympic bronze medalists for Norway
Athletes (track and field) at the 1956 Summer Olympics
Olympic athletes of Norway
Norwegian male steeplechase runners
European Athletics Championships medalists
Medalists at the 1956 Summer Olympics
Olympic bronze medalists in athletics (track and field)